Michael Shahrestani (born 1963) is an Iranian theatre director, playwright, stage and film actor, and arts instructor.He Graduated from Great Art Faculty of National Media Corporation.

Cinema (as an actor)
 The Voices directed by Farzad Motamen, 2008 

 Sayebe Sayeh directed by Ali Jokan, 1995

Theater (as a director or writer) 
 Hamlet by William Shakespeare, Tehran: City Theater of Tehran, 1991
 Ajax by Sophocles, Tehran: Niavaran Cultural Center – City Theater of Tehran, 1987
 Médée (Medea) by Jean Anouilh, Tehran: City Theater of Tehran, 1988
 Arash by Bahram Bayzai, Tehran: Theater office, 1988
 See Morgh SiMorgh by Ghotbedin Sadeghi, Tehran: City Theater of Tehran, 1990
 Les Fourberies de Scapin by Molière, Tehran, 1992
 The wise man and the crazy tiger by Ghotbedin Sadeghi, Tehran: Cultural Heritage organization – Avini Hall- France: vile, 1993
 Bahram Choobineh by Siamack TaghiPoor, Tehran: City Theater of Tehran, 1994
 Rostam’s seven labours by Ghotbedin Sadeghi Tehran: Sadabad Palace, 1995
 Jam's weeping by Ghotbedin Sadeghi, Tehran: City Theater of Tehran, 1995
 Mobarak, the little watch by Ghotbedin Sadeghi, Tehran: Niavaran Palace, 1996
 Times of innocence by Ghotbedin Sadeghi, Tehran:City Theater of Tehran, 1996
 Women of Sabra, men of shatila by Ghotbedin Sadeghi, Tehran: Vahdat Hall- Main hall of city theater of Tehran, 1997
 Arash by Bahram Bayzai, Tehran: City Theater of Tehran, 1998
 Calligraphy of Love by Ghotbedin Sadeghi, Tehran: City Theater of Tehran, 1999
 Seven lost tribes by Ghotbedin Sadeghi, Tehran:City Theater of Tehran, 2000
 Sahoori by Ghotbedin Sadeghi, Tehran: City Theater of Tehran, 2001
 Afshin & Boodalaf Are Both Dead by Ghotbedin Sadeghi, Tehran: City Theater of Tehran, 2003
 Dakhme Shirin by Ghotbedin Sadeghi, Tehran: City Theater of Tehran, 2004
 Akse Yadegari by Ghotbedin Sadeghi, Tehran: City Theater of Tehran, 2005
 The Just Assassins (Les Justes) (Adelha) by Albert Camus, Tehran: City Theater of Tehran, 2005
 Memorial of Zariran (Yadegare Zariran) by Ghotbeddin Sadeghi, Tehran: City Theater of Tehran, 2008
 ShekarPareh’s garden by Ghotbeddin Sadeghi, Tehran: City Theater of Tehran, 2009
 If you had not gone by Ghotbeddin Sadeghi, Tehran: Cheharsou hall of City Theater of Tehran, 2012
 Macbeth by William Shakespeare, Tehran: Iranshahr Theater, 2012

References

External links
Mikaeil Shahrestani on Instagram

Iranian theatre directors
Iranian male film actors
Living people
1963 births
People from Tehran
Iranian male stage actors
21st-century Iranian male actors
20th-century Iranian male actors